Liam Higgins may refer to:

Liam Higgins (golfer) (born 1942), Irish golfer
Liam Higgins (Irish footballer), Kerry Gaelic footballer in Ireland
Liam Higgins (rugby league), English rugby league player
Liam Higgins (New Zealand footballer), New Zealand association footballer. 
Liam Higgins, a character in the TV series The Chase, played by Christian Cooke